

References

Further reading
 
 

H